Captain Clifford Bowman (born 26 March 1899, date of death 31 October 1978) was a World War I flying ace credited with six aerial victories.

Sources of information

References

1899 births
Year of death missing
Royal Air Force personnel of World War I
British World War I flying aces